Devdas is a 1936 Hindi-language Indian drama romance film based on the Sharat Chandra Chattopadhyay novella, Devdas. Directed by Pramathesh Barua, it stars K.L. Saigal as Devdas, Jamuna Barua as Parvati (Paro) and Rajkumari as Chandramukhi. This was Barua's second of three language versions, the first being in Bengali and the third in Assamese.

Plot
Devdas falls in love with Parvati, with whom he has played since childhood and who is the daughter of a poor neighboring family. Devdas goes away to Calcutta for University studies. Meanwhile, Parvati's father arranges her marriage to a much older man. Though she loves Devdas, she obeys her father to suffer in silence like a dutiful Indian wife of those times. Devdas as a result takes to drinking. Chandramukhi, a dancing girl or "prostitute" he has befriended in Calcutta, falls for him and gives up her profession to try to save him. Parvati, hearing of his decline, comes to see him to steer him away from a life of drinking. Devdas sends her back, saying in his hour of final need he will come to her. She returns to her life of duty. Realising his end is near, Devdas decides to keep his promise and meet Parvati. He journeys all night, reaches her house and is found dead outside the high walls of her house. Inside Parvati hears from her stepson Mohan, that Devdas is dead. Grief-stricken at this news, Parvati attempts to run out of her house, in order to pay a last visit to his beloved. But her husband orders the main gate to be closed, as it was a social taboo at that time, not to let women step out of the periphery of their in-laws' residence. Consequently, Paro fails to run out, trips over, and the main gate is shut in front of her. A dead Devdas is taken to the cemetery and cremated by the local people.

Cast

Male
K. L. Saigal as Devdas
A. H. Shore as Chunilal
Pahari as A Friend
K. C. Dey as Bairagi (Blind Singer)
Pramathesh Barua alias Mr. Raju as Mohan
Biswanath as Narayan
Yusuf Attia as Rai Saheb
Kailash as Ramdas
Nemo as Dharmadas
Kedar as Jagannath
Kapoor as Cart Driver

Female
Jamuna as Parbati
T. R. Rajakumari as Chandra
Khettrabala as Piyari
Sitara as Monorama
Ramkumari as Padma
Hemnalini as Parbati's Mother
Sahana as Jasodha
Roshanara as Maid Servant

Soundtrack

See also
Devdas (1935 film), Barua's Bengali version
Devdas (1937 film), Barua's Assamese version
Devdas (2002 Hindi film), Bhansali's 2002 remake
Devdas (2013 film), Bangladeshi version

References

External links

Full movie on Youtube (best quality online)
Encyclopedia of Indian Cinema

Review

Films directed by Pramathesh Barua
1930s Hindi-language films
Devdas films
Indian black-and-white films
Films set in Kolkata
1936 drama films
Articles containing video clips
Indian drama films
Films about courtesans in India
Films based on Indian novels
Films scored by Pankaj Mullick
Films scored by Timir Baran
Films scored by R. C. Boral